The Rio Preto State Park is a state park in the state of Minas Gerais, Brazil.
It protects a mountainous area of cerrado vegetation that is home to various endemic, rare or endangered species. 
Trails provide environmental interpretation, and lead to lookouts that give panoramic views, to rivers and waterfalls, and to archaeological sites with rock paintings.

Location

The Rio Preto State Park is in the municipality of São Gonçalo do Rio Preto, Minas Gerais,  from Diamantina. 
A section of a  colonial-era Estrada Real (Royal Road) passed through the park, and traces still remain.
This was a route used by gold and diamond prospectors.

The park covers part of the Espinhaço Mountains.
It has a rugged relief with quartz rocks that form beautiful cliffs.
The park holds several springs, notably that of the Rio Preto, one of the main tributaries of the Araçuaí River, which in turn is a tributary of the Jequitinhonha River. 
The abundant watercourses form waterfalls, natural pools, rapids, sinkholes, canyons and fluvial beaches with white sands.

History

The Rio Preto was declared a "permanently protected river" in 1991 in response to demand from the local community.
It was opened to visitors in 2002.
Decree 44.175 of 20 December 2005 enlarged the area of the park.
The park became part of the Espinhaço Mosaic of conservation units, created in 2010.

In April 2013, the Public Ministry and Justice department of Minas Gerais charged that the State Forestry Institute had been failing to comply with environmental legislation. There were serious problems such as lack of a management plan, physical structures and personnel, and land tenure issues with the ecological stations of Mata do Acauã and Mata dos Ausentes and the state parks of Biribiri, Alto Cariri, Rio Preto and Serra Negra.

Environment

The park includes lands that used to be the Boleiras, Alecrim and Curral farms. 
Former activities included animal husbandry, capture of live animals and collection of wild fruits.

Lower trees are found at altitudes above  and between rock outcrops.
Semi-deciduous trees are found in the stream valleys.
The eastern part of the park has flora found in the Atlantic Forest.
The park's vegetation in mostly cerrado and alpine tundra.
Flora include monjolo, pau pereira, candeia, sucupira, pau d'óleo, peroba, ipê, araticum, carvalho and various species of evergreens.

Endemic birds include the hyacinth visorbearer (Augastes scutatus), Cipo canastero (Asthenes luizae) and serra finch (Embernagra longicauda).
The burrowing owl (Athene cunicularia), masked water tyrant (Fluvicola nengeta) and grassland sparrow (Ammodramus humeralis) are also found.
Mammals include endangered species such as the maned wolf (Chrysocyon brachyurus), giant anteater (Myrmecophaga tridactyla), giant armadillo (Priodontes maximus) and ocelot (Leopardus pardalis).
Other mammals include cougar (Puma concolor) and deer. 
There are native species of fish, including the jundiá, discovered in Rio Preto and still poorly researched.

Visiting

The park is open from 07:00 to 17:00 from Tuesday to Sunday.
The park has a well-equipped visitor center with an auditorium for 70 people, meeting rooms and an exhibition hall.
There is parking and a restaurant, twelve lodges that can accommodate 52 people, a camping area with room for 25 tents, kiosks, grills and changing rooms. 
Lodgings and camp spaces must be reserved in advance.
Attractions include the Crioulo and Sempre Viva waterfalls, rock paintings and natural lookouts.

There are various trails including the  children's trail and the  cerrado trail, both with places for swimming.
Four trails of varying difficulty lead to archaeological sites with rock paintings.
Other trails lead to lookouts with panoramic views of different areas in and around the park, and to rivers and waterfalls.
The best time to visit is in the cooler and drier season from April to October.

Notes

Sources

State parks of Brazil
Protected areas established in 1994
1994 establishments in Brazil
Protected areas of Minas Gerais